The Wallacean cuckooshrike (Coracina personata) is a species of bird in the family Campephagidae. It is found in the Lesser Sunda Islands and the Kai Islands.
It is endemic to Indonesia.

Its natural habitat is subtropical or tropical moist lowland forest.

References 

Wallacean cuckooshrike
Birds of the Lesser Sunda Islands
Birds of Wallacea
Wallacean cuckooshrike
Taxonomy articles created by Polbot